Matthew John Laidman (born 20 October 1992) is an English former first-class cricketer.

Laidman was born at Sutton in October 1992. He was educated at Whitgift School, before going up the University of Exeter. From there, he went to Oxford Brookes University to complete his masters degree. While studying at Oxford Brookes, he made two appearances in first-class cricket for Oxford MCCU, playing against Worcestershire and Northamptonshire at Oxford in 2016. Playing as a wicket-keeper, he scored 55 runs in his two matches, with a high score of 30, while behind the stumps he took two catches and made a single stumping.

Notes and references

External links

1992 births
Living people
People from Sutton, London
People educated at Whitgift School
Alumni of the University of Exeter
Alumni of Oxford Brookes University
English cricketers
Oxford MCCU cricketers